Monywa Education College is a college located in Monywa, Sagaing Region of Myanmar. The college accepts 650 student teacher trainees to attend the college and employs about 100 staff trainers. Traditional subjects, such as Myanmarsar, English, Mathematics, Economics, Physics, History, and Education Theory are offered. Students are required to wear the traditional academic uniform of a white shirt and green longyi. Students are expected to live, dine, and worship together on campus.

References

Universities and colleges in Monywa
Universities and colleges in Sagaing Region
Universities and colleges in Myanmar